James Alton James (September 17, 1864 – February 12, 1962) was an American educator and historian.

Biography
James was born on September 17, 1864, in Jefferson, Wisconsin. He spent two years at the Platteville Normal School,  and then, after teaching high school two years to pay for the University, entered the University of Wisconsin, where he graduated as valedictorian with an LL.B. in 1888. He received a Ph.D. from Johns Hopkins University in 1893.

He was superintendent of schools in Darlington, Wisconsin, 1888–90; professor of history in Cornell College, Iowa, 1893-97. He became a professor of history at Northwestern University in 1897, becoming professor emeritus in 1935. He was head of the history department for over two decades, and was also the chairman of the graduate student work at the university 1917-1931. He was a member of several educational and historical societies. James died on February 12, 1962, in Evanston, Illinois.

Works
 Government in State and Nation, with Allen Hart Stanford (1901)
 Our Government (1903)
 American History (1909)
 Readings in American History (1914)
 Charles Seignobos, History of Contemporary Civilization, editor (1909)
 George Rogers Clark Papers, editor (Illinois State Historical Society, 1912)

Notes

References

External links
 
 

1864 births
1962 deaths
People from Jefferson, Wisconsin
University of Wisconsin Law School alumni
Northwestern University faculty
Cornell College faculty
Writers from Illinois
Historians from Wisconsin